Green Linnet Records was an American independent record label that specialized in Celtic music. Founded by Lisa Null and Patrick Sky as Innisfree Records in 1973, the label was initially based in Null's house in New Canaan, Connecticut. In 1975 the label became Innisfree/Green Linnet and Wendy Newton joined Null and Sky as operating officer. In 1976 Newton took over control of the now Green Linnet label and moved it to Danbury, Connecticut in 1985. Newton became sole owner in 1978. Newton's love of Irish music had been sparked during a visit to Ireland where she heard traditional music for the first time in a small pub in County Clare.

Artists and imprints
Green Linnet signed Altan, Capercaillie, The Tannahill Weavers and many other significant bands and musicians. From its founding until its sale in 2006 Green Linnet was one of the most influential Celtic music labels, releasing hundreds of albums by a wide range of Irish, Scottish, Breton, Galician and Irish-American musicians. In 1992 a subsidiary called Xenophile Records was added to feature world music from Madagascar, Nigeria, Cuba and other countries. In 1997 Green Linnet launched Celtophile Records to offer budget-priced compilations. There was also a Green Linnet/Redbird series that featured singer-songwriters.

Artist lawsuit and legacy
In 2002 Green Linnet was sued for unpaid royalties by bands Cherish the Ladies and Altan and artists Mick Moloney, Joanie Madden and Eileen Ivers. Most artists were paid and most claims were settled in 2006. But there remain a number of outstanding claims that have yet to be resolved, clouding the legacy left behind by Green Linnet and its then-owner Wendy Newton. Bands have been known to leave the label because of poor management from the label, including Wolfstone and Lúnasa.

In May 2006 Newton sold the label to the Digital Music Group, an aggregator of downloadable music. DMG in turn sold the rights to manufacture and distribute Green Linnet and Xenophile physical compact discs to Compass Records. Both the Green Linnet and Xenophile catalogs remain available through Compass.

Label name
A linnet is a red-breasted song bird known for its twills and twitters. However, in the Irish rebel song tradition, the name "Green Linnet" has a specific meaning. It was the code name for Napoleon Bonaparte who they hoped would break the chains of British rule. Indeed in the early 19th century the Society of United Irishmen (the Irish independence organization led by Theobald Wolfe Tone and Robert Emmet), allied themselves with France against Britain, but as history would prove, to no effect. The songs, however, were passed down to latter generations.

Roster
 
 3 Way Street
 Ad Vielle Que Pourra
 Altan
 Joe Burke
 Kevin Burke
 Buttons & Bows
 Dennis Cahill
 Capercaillie
 Liz Carroll
 Celtic Fiddle Festival
 Celtic Thunder
 Cherish the Ladies
 Jack Coen
 Johnny B. Connolly
 Seamus Connolly
 Brian Conway
 Michael Cooney
 Terry Corcoran
 Kevin Crawford
 Johnny Cunningham
 Marty Cutler
 Deanta
 Tony DeMarco
 Joe Derrane
 Oisín Mac Diarmada
 Tom Doherty
 Seamus Ennis
 Ensemble Choral Du Bout Du Monde
 Fairport Convention
 John Faulkner
 Ffynnon
 Green Fields of America
 Martin Hayes
 The House Band
 Irish Tradition
 Andy Irvine
 Eileen Ivers
 Ron Kavana
 Brian Keane
 James Keane
 Jimmy Keane
 Pat Kilbride
 Kips Bay
 Kornog
 Donna Long
 Lunasa
 Manus Lunny
 Joanie Madden
 Debby McClatchy
 Billy McComiskey
 Manus McGuire
 Susan McKeown
 Matt Molloy
 Mick Moloney
 Pan Morrigan
 Moving Cloud
 Martin Mulhaire
 Brendan Mulvihill
 Paddy O'Brien
 Robbie O'Connell
 Eugene O'Donnell
 Jerry O'Sullivan
 Old Blind Dogs
 Orealis
 Niamh Parsons
 Rare Air
 Red Clay Ramblers
 Reeltime
 Relativity
 Tommy Sands
 Sileas
 Daithi Sproule
 Andy M. Stewart
 Patrick Street
 The Tannahill Weavers
 Teada
 Touchstone
 Trian
 The Tulla Céilí Band
 Brooks Williams
 John Williams
 Wolfstone

See also
 List of record labels
 Compass Records
 Xenophile Records
 Celtophile Records

References

Record labels established in 1976
Record labels disestablished in 2006
American independent record labels
1976 establishments in Connecticut